Mata Hati Telinga is the third album from Indonesian pop group Maliq & D'Essentials. Released on 8 March 2009, it is the band's first album with guitarist Arya "Lale" Aditya, who replaced Satrio Moersid in 2008.
It is also the last album to feature Amar Ibrahim as a full member of the band, though he continues to perform live with them whenever available and has contributed trumpet and flugelhorn to subsequent studio albums.

Track listing
Music and lyrics by Widi Puradiredja unless otherwise stated.

Personnel
Maliq & D'Essentials
Angga Puradiredja – vocals
Indah Wisnuwardhana – vocals
Widi Puradiredja – drums, Moog
Dendy "Javafinger" Sukarno – bass
Ifa Fachir – keyboards
Amar Ibrahim – trumpet
Arya "Lale" Aditya – guitar

Additional musicians
Ricky Lionardi – orchestra arrangement and orchestration (track 1)
Eugene Bounty – alto saxophone and clarinet (tracks 2 and 3)
Enggar Widodo – trombone and tuba (tracks 2 and 3)
Reza Jozef "Rejoz" Patty – percussion (tracks 2 and 3)

Production
Eki "EQ" Puradiredja – producer
Indra Lesmana – mixing and mastering
Widi Puradiredja – engineer
Dendy "Javafinger" Sukarno – engineer

References

2009 albums
Maliq & D'Essentials albums